In finance, a trade is an exchange of a security (stocks, bonds, commodities, currencies, derivatives or any valuable financial instrument) for "cash", typically a short-dated promise to pay in the currency of the country where the 'exchange' is located. The price at which a financial instrument is traded, is determined by the supply and demand for that financial instrument.

Securities trade life cycle
 Order initiation and execution. (Front office function)
 Risk management and order routing. (Middle office function)
 Order matching and conversion into trade. (Front office function)
 Affirmation and confirmation. (back office function)
 Clearing and Settlement. (back office function)

See also

 Electronic trading platform
 Stockbroker
 Stock exchange
 Stock market
 Trader

References
 

Share trading